Shan Prefecture may refer to:

Shǎn Prefecture (陝州), a prefecture between the 5th and 20th centuries in modern Henan and Shanxi, China
Shàn Prefecture (單州), a prefecture between the 9th and 14th centuries in modern Shandong and Anhui, China

See also
Shanzhou District in Sanmenxia, Henan, China
Shan County in Shandong, China
Shan (disambiguation)